The Chief Joseph Dam is a concrete gravity dam on the Columbia River,  upriver from Bridgeport, Washington. The dam is  upriver from the mouth of the Columbia at Astoria, Oregon. It is operated by the USACE Chief Joseph Dam Project Office and the electricity is marketed by the Bonneville Power Administration.

History
The dam was authorized as Foster Creek Dam and Powerhouse for power generation and irrigation by the River and Harbor Act of 1946. The River and Harbor Act of 1948 renamed the project Chief Joseph Dam in honor of the Nez Perce chief who spent his last years in exile on the Colville Indian Reservation. Because of its lack of fish ladders, Chief Joseph Dam completely blocks salmon migration to the upper Columbia River system.

Construction began in 1950, with the main dam and intake structure completed in 1955. Installation of the initial generating units was started in 1958 and completed in 1961.

Type 
Chief Joseph Dam is a run-of-the-river dam which means the lake behind the dam is not able to store large amounts of water. Water flowing to Chief Joseph Dam from Grand Coulee Dam must be passed on to Wells Dam at approximately the same rate.

In the event more water flows to Chief Joseph Dam than could be used for power generation, the spillway gates would be opened to pass the excess water.

Reservoir 
The reservoir behind the dam is named Rufus Woods Lake, and runs  up the river channel. Bridgeport State Park, on the lake, is adjacent to the dam.

See also 

 Hydroelectric dams on the Columbia River
 List of power stations in Washington
 List of dams in the Columbia River watershed
 List of largest hydroelectric power stations in the United States

References

External links 
Chief Joseph Dam - U.S. Army Corps of Engineers (Official site)
 

Dams on the Columbia River
Dams in Washington (state)
Buildings and structures in Douglas County, Washington
Hydroelectric power plants in Washington (state)
Buildings and structures in Okanogan County, Washington
Run-of-the-river power stations
United States Army Corps of Engineers dams
Dams completed in 1955
Energy infrastructure completed in 1958
Energy infrastructure completed in 1973
Energy infrastructure completed in 1979
Gravity dams
1979 establishments in Washington (state)
1955 establishments in Washington (state)